Pitta Kathalu is a 2021 Indian Telugu-language anthology drama film consisting of four short film segments, directed by Nag Ashwin, B. V. Nandini Reddy, Tharun Bhascker and Sankalp Reddy. The film features an ensemble cast of Amala Paul, Ashwin Kakumanu, Eesha Rebba, Jagapati Babu, Satyadev, Lakshmi Manchu, Ashima Narwal, Saanve Megghana, Sanjith Hegde and Shruti Haasan, amongst others. The film was produced by RSVP Movies and Flying Unicorn Entertainment. The film  premiered on Netflix on 19 February 2021. It is Netflix's first Telugu original film.

Segments

Plot

Ramula
Ramula is the narrative of a modest community Telangana young lady named Ramula (Saanve Megghana) and her fit-in vain boyfriend (Abhay Bethiganti). How a nearby lawmaker called Swaroop Akka (Lakshmi Manchu) utilizes the couple for her political reason for existing is the essential subject.

Meera
This story is about a youthful spouse named Meera (Amala Paul), who goes through a difficult stretch as a result of her dubious and insane husband Vishwa Mohan (Jagapathi Babu), who is 18 years older than her.

xLife
xLife is the story of Vik (Sanjith Hegde), a youngster who assumes control over the world with his advanced innovation called X-Life, which has billions of clients.

Pinky
Pinky is about a trying writer Vivek (Satyadev), who is hitched but has an unsanctioned romance with his ex Pinky (Eesha Rebba).

Cast

Reception 

Hemanth Kumar of Firstpost wrote that "On the whole, Pitta Kathalu is a mixed bag and not all short stories find their rhythm and clarity of thought to say what they want to. But it’s also a step in the right direction in many ways. Pitta Kathalu exists in a Telugu cinematic universe and in this world, women are largely in control of their own lives and more than anything, they hate to be mansplained. Thank God, they aren’t treated like deities with pure thoughts and leading pious lives. Their shades of grey is what adds colour to Pitta Kathalu." and gave 3 out of 5 stars. Neeshita Nyayapati of The Times of India wrote about the film that "While one has to search hard to find imperfection in Tharun’s rural tale, Nandini, Nag Ashwin and Sankalp’s urban stories in Pitta Kathalu are not without flaws. Predictability haunts all the stories to a certain extent, but what matters is how the directors manage to pull it off. It is definitely refreshing to see Telugu cinema tell tales of real, damaged relationships (and women) on screen without judgement. Give this one a try this weekend!" Baradwaj Rangan of Film Companion South wrote "Two films work. Two don’t. And the standout is Tharun Bhascker Dhaassyam’s ‘Ramula’, which takes big risks with form."

References

External links 

 

2021 films
2021 drama films
Indian anthology films
Indian direct-to-video films
Direct-to-video drama films
2020s Telugu-language films
Telugu-language Netflix original films
Films directed by Sankalp Reddy
Films directed by Nag Ashwin
Films directed by Tharun Bhascker
Films directed by B. V. Nandini Reddy